The second season of the AMC western-drama television series Hell on Wheels premiered on August 12, 2012, and concluded on October 7, 2012. The series was created and produced by Joe and Tony Gayton who wrote and co-wrote two episodes. They also serve as the show's showrunners. In addition to the Gaytons, Jeremy Gold, John Shiban, and David Von Ancken also serve as series executive producers.

The season follows Cullen Bohannon, who joined a group of Rebel bandits robbing trains and planning to start a new Confederate colony in Mexico. While attacking Thomas Durant's payroll train, Cullen is captured by authorities and sentenced to death, but Durant intervenes with a pardon on the condition that Cullen returns to Hell on Wheels to help oversee railroad construction.

The second season was met with favorable reviews from critics with the premiered watched by just over 2.5 million viewers. The numbers were down significantly from the first season's premiere and finale.

Cast

Main cast 

The second season features ten series regulars. Robin McLeavy and Christopher Heyerdahl are promoted from recurring status.

 Anson Mount as Cullen Bohannon, a former worker for the Union Pacific Railroad, he's part of a band of robbers. (10 episodes) 
 Colm Meaney as Thomas "Doc" Durant, a businessman and investor in the First Transcontinental Railroad, where he hopes to make his fortune. (9 episodes)
 Common as Elam Ferguson, a recently freed slave, he's the chief of railroad police. (10 episodes)
 Dominique McElligott as Lily Bell, having adopted her husband's dream, Lily commits to seeing the railroad through to completion, but has to deal with the moral sacrifices that such an endeavor demands. (10 episodes)
 Christopher Heyerdahl as Thor Gundersen, also known as "the Swede", an undertaker and custodian, having been tarred and feathered by the citizens of Hell on Wheels when he was in charge of security. (10 episodes)
 Tom Noonan as Reverend Nathaniel Cole, former minister of Hell on Wheels, starts to drink again. (7 episodes)
 Eddie Spears as Joseph Black Moon, a Cheyenne who's in love with Ruth but struggles between the traditions of his ancestors and the white men culture. (6 episodes)
 Ben Esler as Sean McGinnes, an ambitious young Irishman looking to make his fortune in the West. (8 episodes)
 Phil Burke as Mickey McGinnes, Sean's brother's, who travelled with Sean to America. (8 episodes)
 Robin McLeavy as Eva, a former indian whore, she supports herself by working in the Hell on Wheels brothel. (9 episodes)

Recurring cast

Production

Filming

Production began in late-April 2012. Interior filming was done in a 56,000-square-foot (over 5202 square meters) makeshift studio near the city's airport. Series producers said filming the season's ten episodes took about 80 days.

Anson Mount (Cullen Bohannon) spoke about the differences between the seasons: "The big question of this season is why is Cullen Bohannon sticking with the railroad. Why is he here? And hopefully that will be absolutely answered by the end of the season. I think for me, it's also been about opening up different facets of the character. I want to find the parts of Cullen that are light, that are aware of humor, and that's been a particularly exciting thing for me to do this year."

Dominique McElligott (Lily Bell) also spoke of the character changes: "When I arrived in Calgary and I read the script, my jaw dropped. I couldn't believe where Lily was. Her motivations have changed, and her ambition from her husband has become her own ambition... Lily's character has surprised me in terms of how cunning she's become and calculating and how determined and ambitious that she is."

Common (Elam Ferguson) spoke about the audience's perception of the American frontier through Elam: "We haven't seen a character like this from that time period, and I think that was important. One thing that I've really appreciated about Elam is that he's a leader and very intelligent. He cares for people, he's passionate, and has his own dream, and thinks for himself. You know, he's a human being. And I think that's one of the most important things that people can learn from Hell on Wheels and that time period is that people were people. Some of the same things that we go through now, they experienced."

Casting

Virginia Madsen was cast in a four-episode story arc as Hannah Durant, wife of Thomas.

Episodes

Reception

Critical reception
The second season received a 60 out of 100 aggregate score, based on nine reviews, indicating "mixed or average" reception at Metacritic. 
Ken Tucker of Entertainment Weekly gave the season start a B+, calling it "visually impressive," adding "the show rises or falls each week on the strength of the moments when [Anson] Mount and Common dominate. Each actor in his own way is capable of lifting Hell on Wheels to the level the series so clearly wants to attain: a fresh take on the old macho code of a-man's-gotta-do-what-a-man's-gotta-do, without posturing or a self-consciousness about the century of Westerns that have preceded it." 
Salons Willa Paskin called the new season "a perfectly adequate piece of television with above adequate production values", adding "even if Westerns aren't particularly your thing, Hell on Wheels doesn't hurt to watch, if, you know, it's not actually fun to watch." 
Verne Gay of Newsday gave it a B- and stated "the cast [...] is good, while the Old West still feels especially beautiful and perilous." 
New York Magazines Matt Zoller Seitz stated the show "still looks and sounds great, has a mostly capable cast, and delivers flat-out terrific Elam scenes, large-scale action set pieces, and lantern-lit images that reminded of The Assassination of Jesse James by the Coward Robert Ford. But the rest is wasted motion." 
Maureen Ryan of The Huffington Post found the second season "marginally better paced and the characters moderated a bit from the broad archetypes seen in Season 1," but added "It's a mystery to me how something about the building of railroad can so often fail to take advantage of the literal engine at its core." 
The AV Club gave Season 2 a grade of B- overall, but suggested that it might be the last.

Ratings
The second-season premiere was watched by just over 2.5 million viewers and 793,000 adults aged 18–49, a 0.6 Nielsen rating. The numbers were down significantly from the first season's premiere and finale. The first-season premiere had a lead-in program in The Walking Dead. The two-hour finale was watched by 2.18 million viewers and received a 0.6 18-49 rating.

References

External links 
 
 

Hell on Wheels (TV series)
 
2012 American television seasons